Tiaan Botes  (born 7 December 2001) is a South African professional rugby union player for the  in the Pro14 . His regular position is fly-half.

He signed for the Kings Pro14 junior players side for the 2019–20 Pro14.

References

South African rugby union players
Living people
Rugby union fly-halves
Southern Kings players
2001 births
Pumas (Currie Cup) players
Rugby union players from Gauteng